The Jefferson County Jail is a historic structure in central Louisville, Kentucky, United States.  Built in 1905 in the Chicago style of architecture, it was designed by D.X. Murphy & Bros.  It comprises two wings: the western, built as cell blocks, and the eastern, which originally housed offices.  A system of corridors was used to separate male and female prisoners and black and white prisoners.

In 1983, the jail was converted into an office complex.  Among its tenants are the offices of the Commonwealth's Attorney, the office of the Circuit Court Clerk, and the Jefferson County Public Law Library. While prisoners are no longer held in the jail, it is still significant as a leading example of public-works architecture.  Its structure has been admired by many leading architects, including the renowned Finnish-American Eero Saarinen.  In 1973, the jail was listed on the National Register of Historic Places for its architectural significance.

References

Further reading
Brown, Theodore M.  An Introduction to Louisville Architecture.

Government buildings completed in 1905
Local landmarks in Louisville, Kentucky
Government of Louisville, Kentucky
Jails on the National Register of Historic Places in Kentucky
County government buildings in Kentucky
National Register of Historic Places in Louisville, Kentucky
Jails in Kentucky
Chicago school architecture in Kentucky
1905 establishments in Kentucky